Rachel Attas (24 July 1934 – 25 November 2004) was an Israeli actress, voice artist, and singer.

Biography

Attas was born in Tel Aviv, the first of five children. Her father emigrated from Thessaloniki while her mother was a Mizrahi Jew. Before her career began she showed a talent for acting and singing and at the age of 16, she made her first stage performance. One of her earliest performances took place in the Habima Theatre in 1953. She starred in a theatre adaption of Cry, the Beloved Country. She was also a member of a satire theatre group which was active during the late 1950s.

Attas also performed many songs which then became hits across Israel and she also sung in plays and television. Her most popular television performance was on the 1970s television show Ha'Yladim Mi'Shchunat Chaim which aired on Israeli Educational Television. She also starred in the film Impossible on Saturday (1965) as well as 5 and 5 (1980).

Attas received local and international attention dubbing animated characters into the Hebrew language. She most notably dubbed characters that originated from the Disney Renaissance period. These include Mrs. Potts from Beauty and the Beast, Ursula from The Little Mermaid, Big Mama from The Fox and the Hound and the Queen of Hearts in Alice in Wonderland.

Personal life
Attas was married to actor and director David Baruch from 1953 until her death in 2004. They had three children together and five grandchildren.

Death
Attas died of cancer in Petah Tikva on 25 November 2004 at the age of 70. She was buried at the cemetery in Pardes Hanna-Karkur.

References

External links

 
 
 
 

1934 births
2004 deaths
Actresses from Tel Aviv
Israeli film actresses
Israeli stage actresses
Israeli television actresses
Israeli voice actresses
20th-century Israeli women singers
Israeli people of Greek-Jewish descent
20th-century Israeli Jews
21st-century Israeli Jews
Jewish Israeli actresses
Jewish Israeli musicians
Israeli Mizrahi Jews
Deaths from cancer in Israel
20th-century Israeli actresses